Featherweight is a weight class in the combat sports of boxing, kickboxing, mixed martial arts, and Greco-Roman wrestling.

Boxing

Professional boxing

History
In the early days of the division, this limit fluctuated. The British have generally always recognized the limit at 126 pounds, but in America the weight limit was at first 114 pounds. An early champion, George Dixon, moved the limit to 120 and then 122 pounds. Finally, in 1920 the United States fixed the limit at 126 pounds.

The 1860 fight between Nobby Clark and Jim Elliott is sometimes called the first featherweight championship. However, the division only gained wide acceptance in 1889 after the Ike Weir–Frank Murphy fight (one of the most famous fights of all time).

Since the end of the 2000s and early 2010s the featherweight division is one of the most active in boxing with fighters such as Orlando Salido, Chris John, Juan Manuel López, Celestino Caballero, Yuriorkis Gamboa, Elio Rojas, Israel Vazquez, Cristobal Cruz, Rafael Márquez, Rocky Juarez, Steven Luevano, Naseem Hamed, Marco Antonio Barrera and Manny Pacquiao.

Current world champions

Current The Ring world rankings

As of March 11, 2023.

Keys:
 Current The Ring world champion

Longest reigning world featherweight champions
Below is a list of longest reigning featherweight champions in boxing measured by the individual's longest reign. Career total time as champion (for multiple time champions) does not apply.

Amateur boxing
To make room for the introduction of women's boxing to the Olympics in 2012, the men's featherweight class was dropped down one kilogram and became bantamweight. Following further adjustments, the 2020 Olympics will again feature men's featherweight and, for the first time, women's featherweight.

Olympic champions

Men’s

1904 – 
1908 – 
1920 – 
1924 – 
1928 – 
1932 – 
1936 – 
1948 – 
1952 – 
1956 – 
1960 – 
1964 – 
1968 – 
1972 – 
1976 – 
1980 – 
1984 – 
1988 – 
1992 – 
1996 – 
2000 – 
2004 – 
2008 – 
2020 –

Pan American Champions

1951 –  Francisco Núñez (ARG)
1955 –  Oswaldo Cañete (ARG)
1959 –  Carlos Aro (ARG)
1963 –  Rosemiro Mateus (BRA)
1967 –  Miguel García (ARG)
1971 –  Juan García (MEX)
1975 –  Dave Armstrong (United States)
1979 –  Bernard Taylor (United States)
1983 –  Adolfo Horta (CUB)
1987 –  Kelcie Banks (United States)
1991 –  Arnaldo Mesa (CUB)
1995 –  Arnaldo Mesa (CUB)
1999 –  Yudel Johnson (CUB)
2003 –  Likar Ramos Concha (COL)
2007 –  Idel Torriente (CUB)

Notable featherweights
 Alexis Argüello
 Henry Armstrong
 Abe Attell
 Marco Antonio Barrera
 Kid Chocolate
 Luisito Espinosa
 Wilfredo Gómez
 Wilfredo Vázquez
 Naseem Hamed
 Paul Ingle
 Chris 'The Dragon' John
 Tom "Boom Boom" Johnson
 Kevin Kelley
Derrick Gainer
 Kina Malpartida
 Juan Manuel Márquez
 Barry McGuigan
 Érik Morales
 Azumah Nelson
 Manny Pacquiao
 Nonito "The Filipino Flash" Donaire
 Tommy Paul
 Willie Pep
 Sandy Saddler
 Calvin Grove
 Vicente Saldivar
 Salvador Sánchez
 Orlando Salido
 Miguel Ángel García
 Juan Manuel López
 Yuriorkis Gamboa
 Jeff Fenech
 Vasiliy Lomachenko

Kickboxing
However, some governing bodies have slightly different classes.

Bare-knuckle boxing 
The limit for featherweight generally differs among promotions in bare-knuckle boxing:

Lethwei
In International Lethwei Federation Japan, Thar A Thae Ta Pwint is the Featherweight Champion.

Mixed Martial Arts

Current champions
These tables were last updated in August 2022. 

Men: 

Women:

See also
Boxing weight classes
Reigning boxing champions

References

Boxing weight classes
Kickboxing weight classes
Taekwondo weight classes
Wrestling weight classes